The Danish Albums Chart is a list of albums ranked by physical and digital sales in Denmark. It is compiled by Nielsen Music Control in association with the Danish branch of the International Federation of the Phonographic Industry (IFPI), and the new number-one album is announced every Thursday at midnight on the official Danish music charts website.

The following are the albums which reached number one in Denmark during the 2010s.

2010

2011

2012

2013

2014

2015

2016

2017

2018

2019

External links
Hitlisten.NU - The official Danish music charts website
danishcharts.dk - Archive of the Danish music charts

Lists of number-one albums in Denmark
Denmark